Village is an unincorporated village in Columbia County, Arkansas.

History
A post office called Village was established in 1888, and remained in operation until 2002. An old variant name was "Machine". The origin of the name "Machine" is obscure.

Education
Magnolia School District operates area public schools. The Village School District consolidated into the Magnolia district on July 1, 1986.

References

Unincorporated communities in Columbia County, Arkansas
Unincorporated communities in Arkansas